Günay Erdem (born 18 April 1978) is a Turkish Architect (graduated) and self-taught landscape architect. Günay Erdem together with his brother Sunay Erdem leads architectural and urban design practice Erdem Architects which they founded in 1998.
Differently from majority of other architects and landscape architects Günay Erdem dissolves the boundaries of these two disciplines in his designs. Using this interdisciplinary approach Günay Erdem‘s both architectural and urban designs gains unique innovative characteristics.
Günay Erdem designed many architectural and urban design projects in 40 countries. He won National Architecture Award in National Architecture Exhibition 2010/Category:Presentation of Ideas.

Teaching 
Since 2012 Günay Erdem has been teaching at Atılım University Department of Architecture Basics of Design and Architectural Design. Günay Erdem in 2013 also has taught at the TOBB ETÜ Department of Architecture where he was Architectural Design Studio executer. At 2014 he was invited to Başkent University Department of Architecture to taught at Architectural Design Studios. Günay Erdem also has been invited to many Architectural Departments at different Universities as the jury member of Design Studios.

Awards 
 Recognition Awards
 2010 Turkish National Architecture Awards and Exhibition/Category: Presentation of Ideas
 TSMD Success Award, Turkey, 2010

 Awards in International Competitions
 La Spezia Arsenale 2062 Open Competition, Italy, Winner, 2014
 Regional Center for Educational Quality and Excellence Competition, Jubail, Saudi Arabia, 3rd Award, 2014
 3C: Comprehensive Coastal Communities Ideas Competition, New York, USA, Wildcard Winner, 2013
 ENVISION 2040, a Green Works Orlando Design Competition, Orlando, USA, Winner, 2013
 International Festival of Art & Construction, Sunshade Competition, Spain, 1st Prize, 2013
 Actıvate! Desıgn Competition to Redefine Public Space in Chicago, USA Honorable Mention, 2013
 Art In The Plaza, Minneapolis, USA, 1st Place, 2013
 Home For Humanity Contest, San Francisco, USA, Winner, 2012
 LifeEdited Apartment #2Challenge Competition, New York, USA, Winner, 2012
 Recconect Riverton Pedestrian Bridge, Canada, Winner, 2011
 Vancouver Viaducts & eastern core, re:CONNECT An Open Ideas Competition, Vancouver, Canada, Winner, 2011
 The Old Harbour Along With Örfirisey in Reykjavik International Competition, Reykjavik, Iceland, Winner, 2009
 ‘Former Fiume Veneto Cotton Mill Area’ International Competition, 9th Position, Turkey, 2004

 Awards in National Competitions
 Elazig Education Campus, National Competition, Mention, Turkey, 2013
 Smart Sings Competition, Mention Award, Turkey, 2011
 Zonguldak Lavuar Conservation Area And The Surrounding Urban Design Competition, Purchasing, Turkey, 2010
 Memorial For The Sarikamis Operation National Architectural Competition, 3rd Award, Turkey, 2008
 Adana Ziyapasa District Urban Design Competition, Purchasing, Turkey, 2008
 Maltepe Regional Park Project Competition, 3rd Award, Turkey, 2007
 Diyarbakir Valley Landscape Planning And Urban Design Competition, 2nd Award, Turkey, 2007
 Teos Marina, 1st Project, Turkey, 2006
 Çeşme Marina, 1st Project, Turkey, 2006
 Kahramanmaras Town Hall Competition, 1st Purchasing, Turkey, 2006
 Balikesir Çamlik Park National Architectural Competition, Purchasing, Turkey, 2006
 Bursa Terminal Square National Architectural Competition, Purchasing, Turkey, 2006
 Beylikduzu Cumhuriyet Street Design Architectural Competition, Mention, Turkey, 2006
 Bursa Kaplikaya Valley Landscape Design Competition, Purchasing, Turkey, 2006
 Uzundere Rekreation Valley Landscape Design Competition, 5th Mention, Turkey, 2006
 Izmit Historical Centre Urban Renewal Design Competition, 1st Mention, Turkey, 2005
 Van Besyol Time Square Design Competition, 3rd Award, Turkey, 2005
 Trabzon Kalkinma Downtown Landscape Design Project, Purchasing, Turkey, 2005
 Gaziosmanpasa City Hall And Environmental Design Competition, 2nd Award, Turkey, 2004
 Izmit Basiskele Environmental Design Competition, 1st Award, Turkey, 2003
 Pananos Beach Landscape Design Competition, Purchasing, Turkey, 2003
 Ottoman Empire Memorial Park Competition, Purchasing, Turkey, 2002
 Damlatas Cave Restoration And Atatürk Park Competition, 1st Award, Turkey, 1999

Selected projects
American University of the Middle East (Kuwait, 2012)
Köprülü Kanyon National Park School (Antalya, Turkey, 2015)
Esertepe Parkı  (Ankara, Turkey, 2014) 
Esertepe Aqua Center (Ankara, Turkey, 2015)
Information and Communication Technologies Authority (Ankara, Turkey, 2012) 
Karabük University Stadium (Karabük, Turkey, 2011)
Bingöl University Campus (Bingöl, Turkey, 2011) 
Silicon Valley of Turkey (Gebze, Turkey, 2014)
Forensic Science Institute of Turkey (Istanbul, Turkey, 2012)
Karabük University Square (Karabük, Turkey, 2010) 
Elazığ Culture Park  (Elazığ, Turkey, 2008)
Teos Marina  (Seferihisar, İzmir, Turkey, 2008)
Elaziğ Education Campus, (Elazığ, Turkey, 2013)
Malatya Planetarium (Malatya, Turkey, 2015)
Beydağ City (Malatya, Turkey, 2015)
Horata City (Malatya, Turkey, 2012)
Port Malabo (Malabo, Equatorial Guinea, 2003)
Güllük Port (Güllük, Bodrum, Turkey, 2003)
International Police Training Center (Ankara, Turkey, 2011)
Edirne Terminal (Edirne, Turkey, 2010)
Datça Körmen Marina (Datça, Turkey, 2010)
HB:BX, High Bridge (New York City, United States, 2010) 
Paris Courthouse (Paris, France, 2006) 
Hobart Waterfront (Hobart, Tasmania, 2007)
Ankara Sincan Metro Station (Sincan, Ankara, Turkey 2009)
Kumkuyu Marina (Kumkuyu, Turkey, 2009)
Ministry of Foreign Affairs (Ankara, Turkey, 2009)
Bursa Nature Park (Bursa, Turkey, 2009)
Kahramanmaraş Municipality (Kahramanmaraş, Turkey, 2006)
Çeşme Marina (Çeşme, Turkey, 2006)
Kaş Marina (Kaş, Antalya, Turkey, 2006)
Ören Marina (Ören, Fethiye, Turkey, 2009)
Denizli Government House (Denizli, Turkey, 2005)
Bursa Santral Garaj Square (Bursa, Turkey, 2005)
Yeşilyurt Stadium (Konak, İzmir, Turkey, 2003)

Exhibitions
 2013 – AIA Bookstore, Washington Square, Philadelphia

References

External links 
 

1978 births
Living people
20th-century Turkish architects
21st-century architects
People from Shumen
Bulgarian emigrants to Turkey
Bulgarian Turks in Turkey